Carlo Acquista is an American retired soccer player and the current head coach the Fordham Rams men's soccer team.

Early life
Acquista played at St. John's University and graduated in 2000. As a freshman, he was a member of the 1996 National Champion team.

Coaching

Acquista began his head coaching career with St. Francis College in 2002. At the time of his hiring, Acquista was one of the country's youngest head coaches (23 years old). In 2007, he became the head coach of the Adelphi Panthers men's soccer team. Acquista was head coach of the Panthers for 11 seasons and led them to 3 Division II NCAA Tournaments. On January 30, 2019, Acquista was appointed just the fifth head coach in the history of the Fordham Rams men’s soccer program.

Head coaching record

References

External links
 Fordham Rams Bio

Living people
St. John's Red Storm men's soccer players
Fordham Rams men's soccer coaches
St. Francis Brooklyn Terriers men's soccer coaches
Year of birth missing (living people)
American soccer coaches
1970s births
Association footballers not categorized by position
Association football players not categorized by nationality